Colin Edwin Ridgway (19 February 1937 – 13 May 1993) was an American football punter distinguished as being the first Australian to play in the National Football League. He also competed in the high jump at the 1956 Summer Olympics.

Early years
In Aussie rules, Ridgway played U19s for Carlton and then in their reserves in 1955.

He was a high jumper who competed at the 1956 Olympic Games (where he was the youngest high jumper) and the 1958 Commonwealth Games for Australia. He had also competed in the Australian Open Track and Field Championships from 1955/56 to 1959/60. Ridgway failed to make the 1960 Australian Olympic team and so accepted an offer of a track and field scholarship to Lamar Tech (now Lamar University). In 1961, he became the first Commonwealth athlete to clear 7 foot in the high jump.

Professional career
Even though he had never played an official American football game, he was discovered by the Dallas Cowboys and signed as an undrafted free agent to their 1965 team. During the preseason, he played a key role in the beating of the Green Bay Packers. He started the year on the taxi squad, before being promoted to the regular roster on 3 November.

It turned out that the running drop-kicks that were commonly used at that time in Aussie rules did not translate well into the American game. He was waived on 24 August 1966, and at the request of the Cowboys, he accepted to play with the Savannah, Georgia, team of the North American Football League, in order to gain more experience.

Death
Colin Ridgway was murdered at his University Park, Texas, home in 1993. Although Kenneth Bicking Jr. was arrested as a probable suspect in 1996, the case still remains unsolved to date.

A man publicly suspected by authorities as a killer-for-hire in Ridgway's murder was convicted 4 September 2014 in Florida of a separate violent crime that happened the year before the murder. Kenneth Alfred Bicking III was found guilty of armed sexual battery and kidnapping with a weapon, according to the Florida State Attorney's office. The maximum sentence is life in prison. Prosecutors said Bicking entered the victim's home in April 1992 without her permission, showed a gun, tied her up and put tape over her eyes and mouth before sexually assaulting her. Bicking was charged after new DNA technology was used in a follow-up investigation in 2011. Police in Dallas theorized that Bicking was hired by his father and Ridgway's widow to carry out the 1993 killing.

See also
List of unsolved murders

References

External links
Colin Ridgway bio
The Easy crime
The incredible life and death of Australia’s NFL trailblazer

1937 births
1993 deaths
1993 murders in the United States
American football punters
athletes (track and field) at the 1956 Summer Olympics
athletes (track and field) at the 1958 British Empire and Commonwealth Games
Australian male high jumpers
Australian murder victims
Australian people murdered abroad
Australian players of American football
Australian rules footballers from Victoria (Australia)
Australian rules football players that played in the NFL
Commonwealth Games competitors for Australia
Dallas Cowboys players
deaths by firearm in Texas
footballers who switched code
Lamar Cardinals track and field athletes
male murder victims
Olympic athletes of Australia
people from University Park, Texas
people murdered in Texas
Athletes from Melbourne
track and field athletes in the National Football League
unsolved murders in the United States